Tricondyloides persimilis is a species of beetle in the family Cerambycidae. It was described by Stephan von Breuning in 1939. Its type locality is Mt. St. Arago, New Caledonia.

It was synonymized in with T. breviscapus in 2010. T. breviscapus'''s type location is central New Caledonia and its initial description recorded a length of 6 mm and a width of 1.5 mm.T. persimilis feeds on Schefflera gabriellae''.

References

Parmenini
Beetles described in 1939
Taxa named by Stephan von Breuning (entomologist)